Auricélio Soares dos Santos (born 27 July 1992), commonly known as Perema, is a Brazilian footballer who plays for Paysandu as a central defender.

Career
Born in Santarém, Pará, Perema graduated with São Francisco's youth setup, and made his debuts in the 2012 Campeonato Paraense. After impressing in the tournament he was loaned to Nacional de Nova Serrana on 26 April 2012.

Perema subsequently served loans at Águia Marabá and Duque de Caxias, representing both sides in Série C. On 11 October 2014 he joined São Raimundo-PA, also in a temporary deal.

On 27 January 2015 Perema signed for Portuguesa, on loan until June. He made his debut for the club on 22 February, coming on as a second half substitute for Fabinho Capixaba in a 1–3 home loss against Santos for the Campeonato Paulista championship.

Honours

Paysandu
Campeonato Paraense: 2017, 2020, 2021
Copa Verde: 2018

References

External links

1992 births
Living people
Sportspeople from Pará
Brazilian footballers
Association football defenders
Campeonato Brasileiro Série C players
Campeonato Brasileiro Série D players
Águia de Marabá Futebol Clube players
Duque de Caxias Futebol Clube players
Associação Portuguesa de Desportos players
Paysandu Sport Club players